Jennifer Kent (born 5 March 1969) is an Australian actress, writer, and director, best known for her directorial debut, the horror film The Babadook (2014). Her second film, The Nightingale (2018), premiered at the 75th Venice International Film Festival and was released in the United States on 2 August 2019.

Early life
Kent was born in Brisbane, Queensland, Australia. She says that she put on her first play when she was seven and also wrote stories. In her late teens, she chose acting as she "wasn't really aware at that stage that women could direct films". She graduated in 1991 from the National Institute of Dramatic Art (NIDA) in Performing Arts (Acting). In a promotional interview for Kent's 2014 film, The Babadook, lead actress, Essie Davis, explained that Kent was in the year above her at NIDA and was "[an] eerily phenomenal actress ... the girl that was obviously the best girl at the whole school."

Career

Acting
Kent began her career as an actress, working primarily in television. She was a main cast member of Murder Call, from creator Hal McElroy, playing Constable, Dee Suzeraine, in all 31 episodes of the series. She also appeared in several episodes of other Australian TV series such as All Saints, Police Rescue and Above the Law. Kent also had a small role in Babe: Pig in the City and The New Adventures of Black Beauty. She has also been an acting teacher for 13 years at major institutions such as NIDA and the Australian Film Television and Radio School (AFTRS).

Directing
After losing interest in acting, Kent was inspired after seeing Dancer in the Dark to pursue a career as a filmmaker. She wrote to the director Lars von Trier, asking to study under him and explaining that she found the idea of film school repellent. In 2002 von Trier allowed her to assist him as part of a directing attachment on the set of his film Dogville (2003) starring Nicole Kidman. In 2006 Kent directed an episode of Two Twisted, an Australian series following in the tradition of The Twilight Zone.

In 2005 Kent directed her short film Monster, which was screened at over 50 festivals around the world, including Telluride, Montreal World, and Slamdance film festivals, SXSW, and Aspen Shortsfest. In 2014 she adapted her short into a feature-length film The Babadook starring Essie Davis whom Kent had known through drama school. The film tells the story of a single mother played by Davis who must confront a sinister presence in her home while dealing with the death of her husband. Kent Explains "[she] was always quite fascinated by people who could suppress really dark, deep, painful experiences and [she] wanted to explore the idea that perhaps pushing down on those terrible experiences is harder than facing them,".The Babadook premiered at the 2014 Sundance Film Festival in the prestigious Midnight section. The film was quickly picked up for distribution in the U.S. by IFC Films. Kent did five drafts of the feature script, received most of her funding from the Australian government (South Australian Film Corporation), then conducted a Kickstarter campaign to help raise US$30,000 to pay for set construction. The Babadook received widespread critical acclaim, with The Exorcist director William Friedkin tweeting that he'd never seen a more terrifying film, and doubled its budget with $4.9 million in the worldwide box office. The Babadook script won the Betty Roland Prize for Scriptwriting at the 2015 New South Wales Premier's Literary Awards. The Film won other awards including: New York Film Critics Circle Award for Best First Film (2014), Empire Award for Best Horror (2015), AACTA Award for Best Film (2015), AACTA Award for Best Direction (2015), AACTA Award for Best Original Screenplay (2015), and the AACTA Byron Kennedy Award (2020).

Kent has been vocal in the press about the lack of female directors in horror cinema. "It will shift, as the world shifts. Women do love watching scary films. It's been proven, and they’ve done all the tests. The demographics are half men, and half women. And we know fear. It's not like we can't explore the subject."

Kent met with executives at Warner Bros. in late 2014 to talk about possibly directing the Wonder Woman film, a job which eventually went to Patty Jenkins.

The Babadook (2014)

Kent's first feature-length film The Babadook", is a supernatural horror film, written and directed by Jennifer Kent. It displays how grief can engulf someone's life completely. The mother, played by Essie Davis, struggles throughout the film with grief, anxiety, and how incredibly hard motherhood can be. Her son, Sam, played by Noah Wiseman has behavioral issues which seem to stem from the single-mother household. One day, the unsuspecting family receives a scary children's book about a supernatural being called "The Babadook". After, receiving the book the family goes through many horrifying encounters until it reaches a boiling point. 

On Rotten Tomatoes, the film received an approved rating of 98% with its 242 reviews.

In late 2014, Kent announced that, due to popular demand, a limited edition of the Mister Babadook pop-up book featured in her film The Babadook would be published in 2015. Kent wrote the book in collaboration with illustrator Alex Juhasz, who had created the prop book used in the film. The book sold out its run of 6,200 copies.

The Nightingale (2018)

Her second film, The Nightingale, deals with murder and revenge in 1825 Tasmania. On Rotten Tomatoes, the film garnered an approval rating of 86%, based on 234 reviews.

Future projects
When asked whether she would be doing a sequel to The Babadook, Kent said that she "will never allow any sequel to be made, because it's not that kind of film. I don't care how much I'm offered, it's just not going to happen."

Kent has at least two feature films currently in various states of development. One of her scripts, Grace, won the Prix Du Scenario for unproduced scripts at the Cinéma des Antipodes festival at Saint Tropez, which presents films from Australia and New Zealand, but Kent said in October 2014, "The story of Grace was very much what I ended up making with The Babadook." Kent said a project, a "surreal drama" about death and letting go set in Australia, has some funding for development. She told The Guardian in May 2014 that HBO was courting her for a TV series.

In June 2015, it is reported that the nonfiction book Alice + Freda Forever is being adapted into a film that Kent would write and direct. The book tells the real-life story of Alice Mitchell and her lover Freda Ward whom she killed in 1892. The film's producer Sarah Schechter stated that she is "thrilled Kent shares the same passion for telling this powerful, intense and unfortunately still timely story"

Film techniquesThe Babadook has more of an emphasis on narrative than many horror films: It tells the relationship between the monster and the family and how they, in the end, learn to live with not only their "inner demons" but the Babadook himself.

The film strays from the typical approach to the genre of horror by using a mix of psychological drama and horror and focusing on the imagination of children slowly turning into a reality. Kent does this by using horror elements in the layout and camerawork. The film uses German expressionist techniques. Many of the scenes are disorienting and dark; artistic flare is used in the lighting, characters' emotions, and sets to add to the overall mood of the film

Kent uses different approaches to the horror genre than classic horror film directors. As The Babadook progresses, for example, the Victorian-style house which is the main set mimics the mother's mental state. As the mother's mind slowly turns erratic, the home follows.

Kent brought together a team of people she felt could bring her idea to the screen. Radek Ladczuk was the film's cinematographer and helped bring her ideas to life. Kent was influenced by old movies, and even wanted to film the movie in black and white but later changed to color. Kent used many different techniques to embody a terrifying set, using colors like "muted grey-and-blue and hints of red as the story became more suspenseful". Throughout the film, she pushed to color grade certain scenes to stay within the color scheme, by altering and enhancing the color of the scene either chemically or digitally.

Ladczuk states that there were five aspects to this film, all shown with different camera movements. The film is split into five different emotions: anxiety, fear, terror, possession, and courage. By shooting with a 32mm lens they were able to capture the mother's feelings and later changed to a 14mm lens. They also used a Steadicam and static camera to help develop the film's layers. Fast and slow motion effects were also added throughout the film, as well as stop motion, and they even mounted a camera vertically on the wall to help with certain shots. A lot of the shots were done in camera because Kent felt that it made the film scarier and more realistic than adding stuff in with CGI later.

Jennifer Kent's work falls under the category of fiction, horror, and trauma. Her work isn't necessarily based on specific real events. Kent's filmmaking process starts off with a central idea that leads her to think about a film's other components. Kent focuses on the themes of mise-en-scène, from the style of editing to the usage of sound, lighting, visuals, locations, but most importantly, the performance and camera angles. She explains that within her filmmaking style, each actor is approached with different techniques, games, and tricks to attain the best possible natural expressions and acting.

Kent was recently asked if Amelia wrote the Babadook to which she replied "It was intended but never said right out. When it turns out that The Babadook is really Amelia, or that Amelia has become possessed by him, it also seems plausible that Amelia is his creator as well as his puppet." Blogger Lynn Cinnamon points out that Amelia used to write children's books, so it makes sense that she used her book-making skills to create the mysterious, haunted object that infiltrates their life. If that's the case, the second book depicting herself as the monster was also made by her, possibly in an insomniac trance.

Psychological horror-dramaThe Babadook'' is presented from the mother's perspective; the struggle of motherhood is a major component of the film's story. According to Clarke, many scenes in the film are relatable because they show the everyday struggles of mothers. Clarke argues that Kent touches on not only parenting but dealing with gossipy friends and sexuality, as shown in a scene where the mother is masturbating. These everyday themes are interspersed with moments of terror and suspense; techniques of classic horror. The film ends with the female lead taming the beast by defending her child, and keeping it in the basement, furthering the theme of motherhood. She takes on the role of a mother to the monster, as shown when she collects worms with her son to bring them to the basement to feed him. Kent's ending is very unorthodox for the horror film genre. This metaphor of when her son grows older, maybe one day she'd show him the monster in the basement in a literal and figurative sense.

Filmography

Film

Acting roles

Other credits

Television

Acting roles

Awards

References

External links
 
'Monster' short film 
'The Babadook'
Jennifer Kent
Jennifer Kent: A Director to Watch

Australian film directors
Australian women film directors
Australian women screenwriters
Horror film directors
Living people
20th-century Australian actresses
21st-century Australian actresses
People from Brisbane
Australian film actresses
Australian television actresses
National Institute of Dramatic Art alumni
1969 births